Bór Zapilski is a village in the administrative district of Gmina Wręczyca Wielka, within Kłobuck County, Silesian Voivodeship, in southern Poland.

The village has a population of 369.

Culture
The International Random Film Festival was hosted in Bór Zapilski in July 2011.

References

Villages in Kłobuck County